The 1928 Saint Mary's Gaels football team was an American football team that represented Saint Mary's College of California during the 1928 college football season.  In their eighth season under head coach Slip Madigan, the Gaels compiled a 5–4 record, won the Northern California Athletic Conference championship, and outscored opponents by a combined total of 105 to 59.  End Malcolm Franklan was selected by both the Associated Press and the United Press as a first-team member of the 1928 All-Pacific Coast football team.

Schedule

References

Saint Mary's
Saint Mary's Gaels football seasons
Northern California Athletic Conference football champion seasons
Saint Mary's Gaels football